B.W. Harris Episcopal High School is a religious secondary school in Monrovia, Liberia. It operates under the Episcopal Diocese of Liberia of the Church of the Province of West Africa.

History

In 1954, Bishop Bravid Washington Harris of the Episcopal Church in New York sent Dr. Joseph G. Moore to Liberia to evaluate the work of the Episcopal Church there. Dr. Moore came to the conclusion that the Trinity Parish Day elementary school and St. Thomas Parish Day secondary school should be consolidated and the programs enriched to better prepare Liberian students for higher and professional vocation at the university level. The Episcopal Church in the United States of America (ECUSA) provided the initial funds to facilitate the consolidation and training. Most of the teaching staffs for both schools were retained and the transition continued throughout the 1950s. 

B.W. Harris Episcopal Elementary and Junior High School officially opened on June 29, 1960 under the leadership of Mr. Emmanuel W. Johnson. There were then a total of 250 students in classes through eighth grade. An additional grade was added every year. The school's first graduating class consisted of 6 students in 1966.

St. Thomas Church pulled out of the consolidated system in 1964, but the school continued to grow. An annex building accommodating the science laboratory, library and other facilities was constructed in 1965, funded by a donation of $65,000 from the Episcopal Church Women (ECW) in the United States. The school's largely stable Board of Trustees saw dissolution in 1985 and a new board installed in 1986.

In 1990, the First Liberian Civil War forced the school to close. Many of the buildings survived but a significant portion of the school's infrastructure was looted. The school reopened in 1993 under principal Reverend Father Dee Wellington Bright offering classes to grades 1-9 and the school obtained a hundred percent pass in the grade 9 National Exams in that year. The kindergarten division was rehabilitated in 1994, as was the grade 10 with additional grades added each subsequent year.

The school was forced to close down again in 1996 due to the April war in Monrovia, when looting again made away with many school materials. A tutorial program was run in August 1997 and regular classes resumed for the 1997–1998 academic year. In December 1997, Mrs. Gertrude Findley was appointed as Principal. The first class of 33 post-war graduates was produced in June 1998.

Notable alumni
Gyude Bryant, Chairman of the Transitional Government of Liberia 2003–2006

References

External links
B.W. Harris Alumni Association
Spartan A-Team Class of 1988 alumni website
B.W. Harris Class of 1987 alumni website

Anglican schools in Africa
Schools in Monrovia
Christian schools in Liberia 
Educational institutions established in 1960
1960 establishments in Liberia